An Odyssey of the North is a 1914 American adventure film directed by Hobart Bosworth and written by Hettie Grey Baker and Hobart Bosworth. The film stars Hobart Bosworth, Rhea Haines and Gordon Sackville. It is based on the 1899 short story "An Odyssey of the North" by Jack London. The film was released on September 3, 1914, by Paramount Pictures.

Cast 
Hobart Bosworth as Naass
Rhea Haines as Unga
Gordon Sackville as Axel Gunderson

References

External links 
 

1914 films
American adventure films
1914 adventure films
Films based on works by Jack London
Paramount Pictures films
American black-and-white films
American silent feature films
1910s English-language films
1910s American films
Silent adventure films